The Zoo di Napoli is a zoo in Naples, Campania, southern Italy, created by Franco Cuneo and Angelo Lombardi in 1940 (then closed and opened for a second time in 1949 after the Second World War) over an area of .

Gallery

References

External links
Official website

Zoos in Italy
Tourist attractions in Campania
Parks in Campania
Buildings and structures in Campania
Zoos established in 1940